Izabella Kuliffay (29 December 1863 – 19 January 1945) was a Hungarian pianist and composer. She was born in Pest, and studied music at the National Conservatory in Budapest from 1877–79, and the Budapest Academy of Music from 1879–83, with teachers including Kornel Abranyi and Gyula Erkel. Her work was also heavily influenced by Franz Liszt.

After completing her studies, Kuliffay taught music in Budapest. She was vice-president of the Hungarian Women’s Choral Union and founded a school for girls. She died in Budapest.

Works
Selected works include:
Magyar suite (zongorán a szerző)

References

1863 births
1945 deaths
19th-century classical composers
20th-century classical composers
Hungarian classical composers
Hungarian music educators
Women classical composers
Women music educators
20th-century women composers
19th-century women composers